Margaret Gatz is a professor of psychology, gerontology and preventive medicine at the University of Southern California's Leonard Davis School of Gerontology. She was elected a Fellow of the American Association for the Advancement of Science in 2012.

Selected publications

References

External links
 Faculty webpage
 

University of Southern California faculty
Living people
Year of birth missing (living people)
Fellows of the American Association for the Advancement of Science